
Gmina Korycin is a rural gmina (administrative district) in Sokółka County, Podlaskie Voivodeship, in north-eastern Poland.

Villages
Gmina Korycin contains the villages and settlements of Aulakowszczyzna, Białystoczek, Bombla, Borek, Brody, Czarlona, Długi Ług, Dzięciołówka, Gorszczyzna, Korycin, Krukowszczyzna, Kumiała, Laskowszczyzna, Łomy, Łosiniec, Mielewszczyzna, Mielniki, Nowinka, Olszynka, Ostra Góra, Popiołówka, Przesławka, Romaszkówka, Rudka, Rykaczewo, Skindzierz, Stok, Szaciłówka, Szumowo, Wojtachy, Wyłudki, Wyłudy, Wysiółki, Wysokie, Zabrodzie, Zagórze and Zakale.

Neighbouring gminas
Gmina Korycin is bordered by the gminas of Czarna Białostocka, Janów, Jasionówka, Jaświły and Suchowola.

References
 Polish official population figures 2006

Korycin
Sokółka County